Glaciimonas immobilis is a psychrophilic, nonmotile, rod-shaped, Gram-negative bacterium of the genus Glaciimonas which was isolated from alpine glacier cryoconite. Phylogenetic analysis has shown it to belong to the family Oxalobacteraceae.

Etymology
Glaciimonas immobilis is composite from the Latin glacies where it was found and immobilis which means motionless.

References

External links
Type strain of Glaciimonas immobilis at BacDive -  the Bacterial Diversity Metadatabase

Burkholderiales
Bacteria described in 2011